Coalinga ( or ) is a city in Fresno County and the western San Joaquin Valley, in central California about 80 miles (128 km) southeast of Salinas.

It was formerly known as Coaling Station A, Coalingo, and Coalinga Station.

The population was 13,380 as of the 2010 census, up from 11,668 at the 2000 census. It is the site of both Pleasant Valley State Prison and Coalinga State Hospital.

History

19th century
Legendary bandit Joaquin Murrieta was killed in 1853 at his headquarters, Arroyo de Cantua, north of Coalinga. California Historical Landmark #344 marks the approximate site of where he was slain, near the junction of present-day State Route 33 and Route 198.

Before 20th-century diesel locomotives, steam locomotives were used, and powered in the San Joaquin Valley by burning coal mined from the northern foothills of Mount Diablo to the north. The Southern Pacific Railroad Company established the site as a coaling station in 1888, and it was called simply Coaling Station A. Local tradition has it that an official of Southern Pacific made the name more sonorous by adding an a to it. However, it is just as likely that the small railside signs of the day, which often abbreviated names, read "COALINGA" to mean "Coaling A." [Another example is Braner's Cut north of Eureka, whose sign said "BRACUT," which has now become the name of that spot along Highway 101.] The resemblance to Nahuatl (where cōātl = "snake") is accidental.

The first post office was established in 1899. The city was incorporated in 1906.

20th century 

The town is mostly surrounded by the Coalinga oil field whose principal operator, Chevron, is a major employer in the area.

1983 earthquake

On May 2, 1983, Coalinga was struck by an earthquake with a moment magnitude of 6.5, which nearly destroyed more than 300 homes and apartment buildings; another 691 buildings suffered major damage, and hundreds more had minor damage.  Damage was severe in downtown Coalinga; the eight-block commercial district was almost totally destroyed. The shock was felt as far away as Los Angeles and western Nevada, and was followed by a series of aftershocks that caused additional minor damage and some injuries. Only one death was reported: a man who succumbed to a heart attack.

2022 water shortage
In 2022, the city struggled to confront an acute water shortage. The city’s only water source is an aqueduct that is managed by the federal government. Officials estimate that the water is going to run dry before the end of 2022.

Geography
The topography is generally level, suitable for a number of field crops which do not require large amounts of water. It is located near the eastern foothills of the Diablo Range.

Geology
Underlying rock formations include the occurrence of Vaqueros sandstone. Surrounding the town in a semicircle from the west, around the north, and to the east are several anticlinal formations containing considerable accumulations of petroleum as the Coalinga Oil Field, from which oil has been withdrawn for more than a hundred years.

The city is located near a particularly active portion of the San Andreas Fault, and earthquakes are frequent.

Climate
Coalinga has a cold semi-arid climate (BSk), with very hot summers and cool winters. Its hardiness zone is 9a.

Economy
The city's main industries are agriculture, oil, Cannabis, education and incarceration. The city is home to the Coalinga Oil Field, operated by Chevron and Aera Energy; the Guijarral Hills Oil Field; Pleasant Valley State Prison; Ocean Grown Extracts; Next Green Wave; and Coalinga State Hospital.

Coalinga is home to California's first new mental health hospital in more than 50 years: a 1,500-bed facility built specifically to house sexually violent predators. Coalinga State Hospital opened in September 2005.

In 2016 the Coalinga City Council was one of the first cities to pass an Ordinance allowing for the Cultivation, Manufacturing and Distribution of Cannabis. The City sold its old Prison Claremont Custody Center to Ocean Grown Extracts for $4.1 Million Dollars to help the city get out of a financial crisis and to supply jobs to the residents. Shortly after the small city voted to allow a single Cannabis Dispensary from Have a Heart that would also supply tax revenue to the city and allow for patients in need to obtain Cannabis. Have a Heart was purchased by Harvest Health, that was then bought out by High Times. Coalinga made millions from the sales of Cannabis and is now the first city in Fresno County to allow an outdoor grow at the old return to custody center. In 2020 due to the Success of Have a Heart Coalinga decided to allow another dispensary that would be the first Cannabis Lounge and is anticipated to be in partnership with Claremont Capital Partners.

Education

Coalinga is the site of West Hills College Coalinga, which is part of the California Community Colleges system.

Its children are served by the Coalinga-Huron Joint Unified School District, of which Coalinga High School is a part.

Demographics

2010
The 2010 United States Census reported that Coalinga had a population of 13,380. The racial makeup of Coalinga was 7,734 (57.8%) White, 549 (4.1%) African American, 171 (1.3%) Native American, 407 (3.0%) Asian, 36 (0.3%) Pacific Islander, 3,937 (29.4%) from other races, and 546 (4.1%) from two or more races. Hispanic or Latino of any race were 7,161 persons (53.5%).

The Census reported that 11,752 people (87.8% of the population) lived in households, 130 (1.0%) lived in non-institutionalized group quarters, and 1,498 (11.2%) were institutionalized.

There were 3,896 households, out of which 1,809 (46.4%) had children under the age of 18 living in them, 1,913 (49.1%) were opposite-sex married couples living together, 658 (16.9%) had a female householder with no husband present, 311 (8.0%) had a male householder with no wife present. There were 341 (8.8%) unmarried opposite-sex partnerships, and 16 (0.4%) same-sex married couples or partnerships. 797 households (20.5%) were made up of individuals, and 220 (5.6%) had someone living alone who was 65 years of age or older. The average household size was 3.02. There were 2,882 families (74.0% of all households); the average family size was 3.49.

The population was spread out, with 3,763 people (28.1%) under the age of 18, 1,610 people (12.0%) aged 18 to 24, 3,646 people (27.2%) aged 25 to 44, 3,308 people (24.7%) aged 45 to 64, and 1,053 people (7.9%) who were 65 years of age or older. The median age was 31.9 years. For every 100 females, there were 123.1 males. For every 100 females age 18 and over, there were 132.1 males.

The homeowner vacancy rate was 3.8%; the rental vacancy rate was 8.4%. 6,192 people (46.3% of the population) lived in owner-occupied housing units and 5,560 people (41.6%) lived in rental housing units.

2000
At the census of 2000, there were 11,668 people, 3,515 households, and 2,632 families residing in the city. These included 805 people who were living in group homes.

The racial makeup of Coalinga under those circumstances was 57.3 percent white, 2.4 percent African American, 1.5 percent Native American, 1.7 percent Asian, 0.2 percent Pacific Islander, 32.3 percent from other races, and 4.6 percent from two or more races. About half the population was Hispanic or Latino.

The median age in 2000 was 28.6 years, younger than the 33.3 figure for California and the 35.3 figure for the United States as a whole.

The median income for a family was $41,208, about $11,000 less than for other families in California or the country at large.

The Coalinga Chamber of Commerce Web site in 2007 estimated a population of 18,061 for the city.

Notes: "Family income" is median family income in 1999 dollars. "Med. home value" is the median value of single-family houses. "Poverty families" is the percentage of families with incomes below the poverty level. "High school diploma" is the percentage of people 25 years and over who had graduated from high school.

Attractions
The Horned Toad Derby is held in Coalinga in late May over the Memorial Day weekend annually. The three-day event is similar to the more famous Jumping Frog Jubilee held in Calaveras County, California, but utilizes locally caught horned toads (lizards) rather than frogs. The tradition began in 1935.

The WHAMOBASS Balloon Rally is hosted by Coalinga annually on the November weekend closest to Montgolfiere Day (November 21) every year. It's the longest consecutively running annual hot air balloon rally in the world. It is sponsored by the Whiskey Hill Atherton Menlo Oaks Ballooning & Sporting Society. Typically, more than 40 balloons ascend at dawn on Saturday and Sunday morning from the athletic field of West Hills College Coalinga. A small number fly on Friday and occasionally on Thursday.

The R.C. Baker Memorial Museum is housed in the former Baker Oil Tools machine shop in town. The museum displays local fossils, models of prehistoric fauna, Native American artifacts, and items from pioneer settlers. A restored 1934 Richfield Gas Station is also on the museum's property.  The museum continues to collect historical items donated to the collection.

The Coalinga Rifle Club, whose 25 point, 1000 yard range facility is west of town, is host to various California State Rifle Championships. These include: California State Long Range, Mid Range, Palma Rifle, Fullbore, Service Rifle and High Power Championships. In the past, the Navy SEALs have trained at the rifle club. It is also the home of the California Grizzlies, Junior National Champions for the last four years. They have recreational facilities for rifle, pistol, shotgun and a 500-meter Metallic Silhouette Range.

The New Coalinga Municipal Airport is host to the annual Northern California Aerobatic contest. This early June event is typically the largest of five annual California regional aerobatic contests sanctioned by the International Aerobatic Club. It relocated to Coalinga from Paso Robles in 2013. Visitors to the airport can view upwards of 45 pilots flying a wide variety of competitive aircraft in five categories of competition over a two-day period.

The Harris Ranch is a cattle ranch that features a hotel, several restaurants, and a gift shop for travelers. It is located on Interstate 5 about 13 miles northeast of Coalinga. The Harris Ranch Airport is nearby.

Transportation
Coalinga is located at the junction of California State Route 198 and California State Route 33.

Fresno County Rural Transit Agency provides bus service between Coalinga and Fresno.

The city owns the New Coalinga Municipal Airport, located east of town.

Notable people
 Jeffrey L. Bannister, U.S. Army major general, born in Coalinga
 Stanley George "Frenchy" Bordagaray, baseball player
 John McCollum, operatic tenor
 Daryl Patterson, baseball pitcher
 Jo Stafford, singer, television personality, Grammy Award winner
 Sirhan Sirhan, convicted of murdering Robert F. Kennedy, was housed in the Pleasant Valley State Prison
Pat and Lolly Vegas, musician and vocalists of the Native American/Chicano rock band Redbone. They were inducted into the Native American Music Hall of Fame in 2008.
 Hal Finney, Computer Scientist and Inventor of the Reusable Proof-of-Work System which was instrumental in the development of BitCoin

See also

References

External links

 
 Coalinga Chamber of Commerce.com: History of Coalinga
 Coalinga Huron Library: Library
 The Bancroft Library, oac.cdlib.org: Historical Photographs of Coalinga (1910–1925)

 
1888 establishments in California
Cities in Fresno County, California
Incorporated cities and towns in California
Populated places established in 1888
San Joaquin Valley